Featherston is a surname of English origin, at least as old as the 12th century. The link with "Featherstone" is probably not traceable, but people researching both spellings (and others such as "de Fetherestanhalgh") contribute to the collection of pages in the website called "The Featherstone Society".

People having the surname include:

C. Moxley Featherston (1914–1998), United States Tax Court judge
Isaac Featherston (1813–1876), mid-19th century New Zealand politician (Colonial Secretary in 1861)
J. P. Featherston (1830–1917), mayor of Ottawa 18741875
Joseph Featherston (1843–1913), member of the Canadian House of Commons
Katie Featherston (born 1982), American actress noted for playing the role of Katie in the Paranormal Activity series
William Ralph Featherston (1848–1875), Christian hymnwriter
Winfield S. Featherston (1821–1891), U.S. Representative from Mississippi and brigadier-general in the Confederate States Army during the American Civil War

See also
 Featherstone (disambiguation)